Changa Manga railway station (Urdu and ) is located in Changa Manga town, Kasur district of Punjab province, Pakistan.

See also
 List of railway stations in Pakistan
 Pakistan Railways

References

External links

Railway stations in Kasur District
Railway stations on Karachi–Peshawar Line (ML 1)